The northwestern climbing salamander (Bolitoglossa sima), also known as the northwestern mushroomtongue salamander, is a species of salamander in the family Plethodontidae. It is endemic to Ecuador and found in the northwestern lowlands of the country at elevations below  asl. It has been recorded in dense wet forest and in a grassy field, cleared for cattle grazing, although it is not known whether it could adapt to human-altered habitats. Agriculture and logging are threats to its habitat. It has been found in the Cotacachi Cayapas Ecological Reserve.

References

simus
Amphibians of Ecuador
Endemic fauna of Ecuador
Taxa named by Léon Vaillant
Amphibians described in 1911
Taxonomy articles created by Polbot